Gulki Joshi is an Indian television actress best known for portraying S.H.O. Haseena Malik in Sony SAB's Maddam Sir.

Career
She was first seen in Zee TV's Phir Subah Hogi and in Life OK's Nadaan Parindey Ghar Aaja. She also portrayed the role of Sawri in Colors TV's Ek Shringaar-Swabhiman and Naina in Zee TV's Piyaa Albela. She starred as Devaki in &TV's mythological drama Paramavatar Shri Krishna. She played the role of a reporter in MX Player's Bhaukaal.

She has also acted in stage plays and has been active on the theatre circuit.

In 2019, she was seen playing Ambika in Zee Theatre's play Purush opposite Ashutosh Rana.

From 2020 to 2023, she played a Lucknow based female cop S.H.O. Haseena Mallik in Sony SAB's Maddam Sir.

Filmography

Films

Television

Web series

References

External links

21st-century Indian actresses
Actresses in Hindi television
Actresses from Indore
Indian television actresses
Living people
Mithibai College alumni
1990 births